Kanera may refer to:

 Kanera khel, an Afghan clan
 Kanera, Berasia, a village in India
 Kanera, Huzur, a village in India